William Slade may refer to:
 William Slade (politician) (1786–1859), American politician, governor of Vermont
 William Slade (valet), employee of President Lincoln
 Will Slade (born 1983), Australian footballer
 William Slade (athlete) (1873–1941), 1908 Olympics tug of war competitor
 Bill Slade (William Slade, 1898–1968) English football manager
 Billy Slade (William Douglas Slade, 1941–2019), Welsh cricketer